Bardwell Park railway station is located on the East Hills line, serving the Sydney suburb of Bardwell Park. It is served by Sydney Trains T8 Airport & South line services.

History
Bardwell Park station opened on 21 September 1931 when the East Hills line opened from Tempe to East Hills. In 2000, as part of the quadruplication of the line between Wolli Creek and Kingsgrove, through lines were added on either side of the existing pair.

On 22 April 2015 the station suffered significant flooding due to inclement weather, with the flood water nearly reaching the height of the platform. A time lapse video of CCTV from the station was released publicly showing the rising flood water.

Platforms & services

Transport links
Punchbowl Bus Company operates one routes via Bardwell Park station:
446: Roselands Shopping Centre to Kogarah via Earlwood and Bexley North

Transit Systems operate two routes via Bardwell Park station:
473: Campsie to Rockdale station via Clemton Park, Earlwood, Turrella and Arncliffe
491: Five Dock to Hurstville via Ashfield, Canterbury and Earlwood

References

External links

Bardwell Park station details Transport for New South Wales

Railway stations in Sydney
Railway stations in Australia opened in 1931
East Hills railway line
Bayside Council